Ali Arab (also Romanized as ‘Alī ‘Arab) is a village in Sardasht Rural District, Sardasht District, Dezful County, Khuzestan Province, Iran. At the 2006 census, its population was 27, in 5 families.

References 

Populated places in Dezful County